Fojnička River ( / Фојничка ријека, "Fojnica River") is a left tributary of the Bosna in Bosnia and Herzegovina. It flows for 46 kilometres with a basin area of 727 km².
The Željeznica and the Lepenica are tributaries of the Fojnička River. It is among last remaining sanctuaries for huchen (Hucho hucho) in the Bosna river basin, others being the Krivaja, and possibly the Lašva and the Željeznica.

See also
Visoko

References

External links

Rivers of Bosnia and Herzegovina